is an ongoing Japanese action suspense seinen manga series written by Soji Shimada and illustrated by Tenka Hara. Published by Kodansha, it is serialized on Weekly Morning manga magazine and has been compiled into three volumes so far. A Japanese television drama adaptation, Tensai Tantei Mitarai ~Nankai Jiken File~ Kasa wo Oru Onna, was broadcast on Fuji Television on March 7, 2015.

Plot

Characters
Kiyoshi Mitarai
Kazumi Ishioka

Volumes
1 (January 23, 2013)
2 (October 23, 2013)
3 (April 23, 2014)

Reception

References

2013 manga
Seinen manga
Fuji TV original programming
Kodansha manga